Erivan Karl Matthias Haub (29 September 1932 – 6 March 2018) was a German billionaire businessman, and the managing director and part owner of Tengelmann Group, one of Germany's largest retailers. At the time of his death in March 2018, his net worth was estimated at $6.4 billion.

Early life
Erivan Haub was born 29 September 1932 in Wiesbaden, Germany. He was the son of Erich Haub and Elizabeth Haub (née Schmitz-Scholl) (1899–1977), who originates from the Mülheim family Schmitz-Scholl, the owners of the grocery chain Tengelmann.

Career
After the Second World War, he completed two internships with the Jewel Tea company in Chicago and the Alpha-Beta company in La Habra, California, before returning to Germany to study economics at the University of Hamburg. In the 1960s, he and his wife lived in Tacoma, Washington. He gave a big donation to the Tacoma Art Museum which led to more extensive Western Art ownership. At one time, he was the 6th richest man in the U.S., just one position ahead of Bill Gates, but later dropped to about 250th. Haub died at his home in Wyoming, US.

He joined the family business in 1963.  Upon the death of his uncle Karl Schmitz-Scholl in March, 1969 he became the group's managing director.  Haub concentrated the Tengelmann group business on the retail trade. Under his guidance Tengelmann expanded:  in 1971 it took over the grocery chain Kaiser's; in 1972 Haub founded the discount grocery retailer Plus.  In the following years, Tengelmann focused on the development of its international business, which led to the 1979 takeover of The Great Atlantic & Pacific Tea Company.  In 2000, he handed the position over to his son Karl-Erivan, and joined the supervisory board.

Family
Erivan Haub married Helga Otto in 1958.  They lived in Wiesbaden and had three sons:
 Karl-Erivan Haub (1960-2018)
 Georg Haub
 Christian W.E. Haub (born 1964)

Honors
The Haub School of Business at Saint Joseph's University is named in his honour.  The Helga Otto Haub School of Environment and Natural Resources at the University of Wyoming is named for his wife, Helga.

See also
List of billionaires

References

1932 births
2018 deaths
German businesspeople in retailing
20th-century German businesspeople
21st-century German businesspeople
Officers Crosses of the Order of Merit of the Federal Republic of Germany
Members of the Order of Merit of North Rhine-Westphalia
People from Hesse-Nassau
People from Wiesbaden
German billionaires
People from Pinedale, Wyoming
Erivan
University of Hamburg alumni